Uri Ra'anan, originally named Heinz Felix Frischwasser-Ra’anan (born June 10, 1926, in Vienna; died August 10, 2020), was an American expert in the politics of communist countries, particularly the Soviet Union and China, and in the resurgence of post-Soviet Russia. He taught at Boston University where he was involved in the University Professors Program, and also at the International Security Studies Program (Fletcher School). He spoke at the Ford Hall Forum twice, in 1978 and again in 2007.

Early life and education
He received an M.A. and M.Litt. from Oxford University.

Academic career
Uri Ra’anan was on the faculty of the Fletcher School of Law and Diplomacy at Tufts University for over two decades, holding the titles of Professor of International Politics and Director of the International Security Studies Program.

He has also taught at the Massachusetts Institute of Technology, Columbia University, and the City University of New York. In addition, he has been an associate of the Davis Center at Harvard University.

At Boston University, he served as director of the Institute for the Study of Conflict, Ideology and Policy, teaching there from 1988 until his retirement in 2009.

Books and other writings
He has written, co-written, edited, or co-edited over two dozen books and contributed to 19 others. They include:
 The USSR arms the third world; case studies in Soviet foreign policy. Cambridge, Mass., MIT Press, 1969. According to WorldCat, the book is held in 823 libraries  
 Arms transfers to the third world: the military buildup in less industrial countries. (ed. with RL Pfaltzgraff, G Kemp) - Westview Press, 1978
 Intelligence policy and national security. (ed. with   RL Pfaltzgraff, U Ra'anan, W Milberg) - London: Macmillan, 1981
 Projection of power: perspectives, perceptions, and problems.  (ed. with  RL Pfaltzgraff, G Kemp) - Archon Books, 1982
 International security dimensions of space.  (ed. with R Pfaltzgraff) - Archon Books, 1984
 Security commitments and capabilities : elements of an American global strategy (ed. with R Pfaltzgraff) - Archon Books, 1985
 Hydra of Carnage: The International Linkages of Terrorism and Other Low-intensity Operations: the Witnesses Speak (ed with  RH Shultz, R Pfaltzgraff Jr, E Halperin) Lexington Books, 1986.
 Gorbachev's USSR: a system in crisis (ed. with Igor Lukes) : Macmillan, 1990.
 The Soviet empire: the challenge of national and democratic movements (ed.): Macmillan, 1990.
 Inside the Apparat: Perspectives on the Soviet Union  (ed. with Igor Lukes) Lexington Books, 1990.
 Book chapter:  "The nation-state fallacy" (p5-20), in: Conflict and Peacemaking in Multiethnic Societies, by Joseph V. Montville (ed.), New York: Lexington Books.  
 State and nation in multi-ethnic societies: The breakup of multinational states. (ed.) : Manchester University Press, 1991 
    German translation: Staat und Nation in multi-ethnischen Gesellschaften.   Passagen Verlag, 1991  
 Russian Pluralism – Now Irreversible?   (ed. with Keith Armes; Kate Martin)   St. Martin's Press, 1992.
 Russia – a return to imperialism? (ed. with Keith Armes; Kate Martin)  St. Martin's Press, 1996.
 Flawed succession: Russia's power transfer crises ( ed. )  Lexington Books, 2006

He has also published extensively in both scholarly and general periodicals, including the Slavic Review, Strategic Review, Global Affairs, Soviet Analyst, the Boston Globe, and the Boston Herald.

In an August review for Commentary of Hydra of Carnage, a collection of contributions to a 1985 Tufts conference by Ra'anan and others, Angelo Codevilla wrote that the essays “inadvertently make it clear that government lacks the intellectual and moral tools” to meet the challenge of terrorism.

His 2006 book on Russia, Flawed Succession, was called "superb" by historian Simon Sebag Montefiore in the NYT.

Personal life
He had a son named Gavriel who graduated from Fletcher in 1978, who died of cancer several years later.

References

External links
 Official page

1926 births
2020 deaths
American political scientists
Austrian emigrants to the United States
Boston University faculty
Tufts University faculty